Järve railway station is a railway station in the Kristiine district of Tallinn, Estonia. The station serves the Järve sub-district which has approximately 3000 residents.

The station was opened in 1923, and the station building was completed in 1926. There are two platforms along the two-track railway, both 150 meters long.

History 
Although the Tallinn-Paldiski railway opened already in 1870, a station on this site was not opened before 1923. The station building was completed in 1926. Ticket sale was terminated in the station building in 1998.

Operations 
Elron's electric trains from Tallinn to Keila, Turba and Klooga-Rand stop at Järve station. The station belongs to the Zone I, within which traffic is free for Tallinners. In 2022, there were approximately 56 train departures per day at Rahumäe railway station towards Tallinn city center.

There is a possibility to transfer to TLT (Tallinn City Transport) bus line 5, 18, 32, and 57 at a bus station on Pärnu maantee.

Architecture 

The station building in national romantic style was built in 1926 to designs by the Estonian architect and painter Karl Burman (1882–1965).

See also
 List of railway stations in Estonia
 Rail transport in Estonia

References

External links

 Official website of Eesti Raudtee (EVR) – the national railway infrastructure company of Estonia  responsible for maintenance and traffic control of most of the Estonian railway network
 Official website of Elron – the national passenger train operating company of Estonia responsible for all domestic passenger train services in Estonia

Railway stations in Estonia
Buildings and structures in Tallinn
Transport in Tallinn
Railway stations opened in 1923